In the Blockade of Almeida (14 April – 10 May 1811) a French garrison under Antoine François Brenier de Montmorand was surrounded by approximately 13,000 Anglo-Allied soldiers led by Generals Sir Alexander Campbell, 1st Baronet and Sir William Erskine, 2nd Baronet. After a French relief attempt failed, Brenier and his troops broke out at night after blowing up portions of the fortress. To the fury of the British army commander Arthur Wellesley, Viscount Wellington, most of the French escaped due to their commander's single-minded determination, British fumbling, and remarkably good luck. The action took place during the Peninsular War portion of the Napoleonic Wars. The town was originally captured from a Portuguese garrison during the 1810 Siege of Almeida.

Background
On 11 October 1810, Marshal André Masséna's French army found itself confronted by the elaborately built and well-defended Lines of Torres Vedras in its invasion of Portugal. Foiled by the virtually impregnable defenses, the French commander halted to wait for reinforcements. Unable to secure enough food, the French army wasted away from starvation and illness. By 1 January 1811, the 65,000-strong army had shrunk to 46,500. Massena reluctantly retreated from Portugal beginning on 6 March. The British army of Viscount Wellington beat the French II Corps of General of Division Jean Reynier at the Battle of Sabugal on 3 April 1811. The next day, the British invested the fortress of Almeida.

After Marshal André Masséna's retreat from Portugal, the French installed a garrison of 1,400 men under Brenier in the fortress. These troops were blockaded in the town by forces under Arthur Wellesley, 1st Duke of Wellington. Since the Anglo-Portuguese Army had no heavy guns to breach the walls, they were forced to starve the garrison out. Because of this, this operation was technically a blockade rather than a siege.

From 3 to 5 May 1811, Masséna failed to relieve Almeida in the Battle of Fuentes de Oñoro. During this time, the blockade was maintained by Major General William Erskine's 5th and Major General Alexander Campbell's 6th Divisions, plus Count Barbacena's 300-man Portuguese cavalry brigade. Campbell guarded the south and west sides of the fortress with too many soldiers and placed his men too far from the city. Though instructed by Wellington to block the Barba del Puerco bridge on the afternoon of the 10th, Erskine neglected to forward the necessary orders in time.

Escape
With great skill, Brenier slipped his men through the Anglo-Portuguese lines on the night of 10–11 May. The fortifications were rigged with explosives and blew up after the French cleared out. After overrunning a Portuguese outpost, Brenier headed northwest toward the Barba del Puerco bridge. Campbell and Brigadier General Denis Pack gave chase with some troops, but a British colonel whose regiment was stationed near the breakthrough failed to pursue. Another regiment arrived at the Barba del Puerco, but since the French had not gotten there yet, the unit marched to another location. The French were intercepted just as they reached the bridge and numbers of them were killed or captured. A total of 360 Frenchmen became casualties during the night. An unwise attempt by the 36th Foot Regiment to storm the bridge was repelled with 35 casualties by the French 31st Light Infantry Regiment from Reynier's II Corps.

An enraged Wellington later wrote,

Aftermath
The guerilla war proceeded till the end of the Peninsular war.

The Spanish conventional warfare proceeded 
till the end of the Peninsular war.

Napoleon had ended his invasion of Spain with the occupation of Madrid.

The third Portuguese campaign ended with the French retreat out of Portugal.

The French conquest of Aragon started with the Siege of Tortosa.

Notes

References

Further reading

External links
 

Battles of the Peninsular War
Battles of the Napoleonic Wars
Battles involving the United Kingdom
Battles involving France
Battles involving Portugal
Conflicts in 1811
1811 in Portugal
April 1811 events
May 1811 events